In Greek mythology, Theonoe (Ancient Greek: Θεονόη) was a character in Euripides' play, Helen—daughter to the Egyptian king, Proteus, and the Nereid Psamathe. She was the sister of Theoclymenus, the current king of Egypt. Her name means "divine wisdom," coming from theós 'god' and nóos or noûs 'mind.' Theonoe's earlier name was Eido (Eidothea).

Mythology 
According to Euripides' telling, Paris only abducted a phantom of the title heroine from her husband, Menelaus, and the real Helen was taken to Egypt by the gods, where Theoclymenus attempted to marry her, but she would not consent. Theonoe didn't want her brother to marry Helen against the latter's will, and when Menelaus also ended up in Egypt, (after getting caught in a sea storm on his way home from Troy), she helped them escape together. Theoclymenus accused Theonoe of plotting against him and sentenced her to death, but the Dioscuri (brothers of Helen) intervened and saved her life. According to Conon, Theonoe fell in love with Canopus, the young and handsome pilot of Menelaus' ship; he, however, did not return her feelings.

Notes

References 

 Conon, Fifty Narrations, surviving as one-paragraph summaries in the Bibliotheca (Library) of Photius, Patriarch of Constantinople translated from the Greek by Brady Kiesling. Online version at the Topos Text Project.
 Euripides, The Complete Greek Drama, edited by Whitney J. Oates and Eugene O'Neill, Jr. in two volumes. 2. Helen, translated by Robert Potter. New York. Random House. 1938. Online version at the Perseus Digital Library.
 Euripides, Euripidis Fabulae. vol. 3. Gilbert Murray. Oxford. Clarendon Press, Oxford. 1913. Greek text available at the Perseus Digital Library.

Women in Greek mythology
Egyptian characters in Greek mythology